The fundamental principles for the exercise of BDSM require that it be performed with the informed consent of all parties. Since the 1980s, many practitioners and organizations have adopted the motto safe, sane and consensual, commonly abbreviated SSC, which means that everything is based on safe activities, that all participants are of sufficiently sound mind in their conduct, and that all participants do consent. It is mutual consent that makes a clear legal and ethical distinction between BDSM and such crimes as sexual assault and domestic violence.

Some BDSM practitioners prefer a code of behavior that differs from SSC. Described as "risk-aware consensual kink" (RACK), this code shows a preference for a style in which the individual responsibility of the involved parties is emphasized more strongly, with each participant being responsible for his or her own well-being. Advocates of RACK argue that SSC can hamper discussion of risk because no activity is truly "safe", and that discussion of even low-risk possibilities is necessary for truly informed consent.

Still other BDSM practitioners prefer a code of behavior described as " Personal Responsibility, Informed, Consensual Kink  " (PRICK). This code is considered the next evolution beyond RACK. It was developed in response to individuals within the community questioning if a person can truly consent if they are not informed about the potential risks involved with certain acts or behaviors. PRICK makes it clear that all practitioners should take personal responsibility for their kink. Informed means (or implies) that you understand what is about to happen - risks and all. The idea being that if you take personal responsibility for yourself and you're informed, now you can truly consent.

Likewise, Safe, Sane, Informed, Consensual, Kink (SSICK) incorporates all of the above, to preclude abuse and violation of another's well being. Safety and sanity are objective "reasonable person" standards under the circumstances of the participants and the Kink, which incorporate mutual responsibilities for both the forseeable and unforeseeable consequences of the participant's choices and decisions. Being adequately informed is a subjective determination of one's self awareness, and another participant's awareness. Consent pertains to the continuous choice: to delegate authority for another to choose how to act in a particular manner; to accept a fiduciary duty in exercising delegated authority (placing another's interests above one's own interests); or, to otherwise interact within communicated boundaries and no more. A common misconceptions is that one can relinquish their personal power -- often called consensual non-consent, which merely equates to abuse. Every person always has the inherent and inalienable power to amend consent at any time, in relation to any BDSM interaction.

See also 
 Consent (BDSM)
 Limits (BDSM)
 Risk-aware consensual kink
 Safeword

References 

BDSM terminology
Consent
Sexual ethics